El Arish International Airport  is an airport near El Arish, Egypt. In 2011 the airport served 5,991 passengers (-45.4% vs. 2010).

Operations 
The airport was the home base of Palestinian Airlines which ceased operations in December 2020. In May 2012, the company restarted two-weekly flights to Amman, with flights to Jeddah, Saudi Arabia to follow soon. It is one of the closest airports to the Gaza Strip; El Gora Airport is slightly closer but has no scheduled air service. Palestinian Airlines relocated to El Arish International Airport after Yasser Arafat International Airport was rendered non-operational when the runway was destroyed by Israeli forces in 2001. The airport has been mainly used for Palestinian passengers from the Gaza Strip traveling to Jeddah, Saudi Arabia, for the annual Hajj Muslim pilgrimage.

See also 
Transport in Egypt
List of airports in Egypt

References

 
 

Defunct airports in Egypt
Airports in Egypt
North Sinai Governorate